David Henry Hickman was a businessman, educator, and legislator from Columbia, Missouri, United States.  He was a member of the Missouri General Assembly from 1838 to 1842 and helped compose legislation requiring the state to support public 'common schools' with at least twenty-five percent of the state's revenue.  He was also instrumental in the founding and development of Stephens College and served as a curator of the University of Missouri.  David H. Hickman High School was built on his country estate in 1927 and named after him. He is buried in the Columbia Cemetery.

Footnotes

University of Missouri curators
Politicians from Columbia, Missouri
People from Bourbon County, Kentucky
Stephens College people
1821 births
1869 deaths
Businesspeople from Columbia, Missouri
Burials at Columbia Cemetery (Columbia, Missouri)
19th-century American businesspeople